The Flying Deuces, also known as Flying Aces, is a 1939 buddy comedy film starring Laurel and Hardy, in which the duo join the French Foreign Legion. It is a partial remake of their short film Beau Hunks (1931).

Plot
While the boys are vacationing in Paris from working in a fish market in Des Moines, Ollie falls in love with Georgette (Jean Parker), the beautiful daughter of an innkeeper. Unbeknownst to him or Stan, she is married to a Foreign Legion officer named Francois (Reginald Gardiner). When Ollie summons the courage to propose to Georgette ("that is, if you don't mind"), she kindly rejects him because there is someone else...very much so. Heartbroken, Ollie at first contemplates suicide. He is joined by his friend Stan in sinking himself in the Seine River. (In some cuts of the film this proceeding is complicated by the presence of an "escaped shark".) Stan repeatedly interrupts Ollie as he is about to throw the weight in, and asks him to consider the possibility of reincarnation. Ollie decides his preference is to return as a horse. Francois catches sight of them and convinces them instead to enlist in the Foreign Legion in order to forget Ollie's failed romance. When Stan asks how long it will take Ollie to forget, Francois says it will only take a matter of a few days.

The commandant (Charles B. Middleton) introduces Ollie and Stan to their daily legionnaire duties, for which their daily wage is 100 centimes, which, translated into American currency amounts to only three cents. Naturally Ollie and Stan refuse because they don't work for less than twenty-five cents per diem. For this uppity attitude they are sentenced to hard menial labor, washing and ironing a mountain of laundry, with legion officers constantly hounding them. Finally and 'miraculously', Ollie forgets his broken romance completely. His and Stan's purpose in joining the Foreign Legion fulfilled, they abandon their task, discarding the still hot iron, which unintentionally sets the laundry pile aflame. Angered by the hard work and low pay of the Foreign Legion, Ollie writes the commander a very stern and insulting farewell letter and signs it.

After leaving the commandant's office, they eventually meet Georgette again. Ollie, delighted that she has seemingly changed her mind and come back to him, proceeds to embrace and kiss her. An enraged Francois, upon witnessing this, confronts Ollie and sternly informs him that Georgette happens to be his wife; then he threateningly warns him to keep away from Georgette lest he suffer torturous consequences. After Francois leaves, the commandant arrives and, having discovered first the flaming mountain of laundry and then Ollie's insulting farewell note, places them both under arrest for the death penalty offense of desertion. They are taken to military prison, court martialed in absentia, and sentenced to death by firing squad at dawn. Stan amazes Ollie by playing "The World Is Waiting for the Sunrise" on the bedsprings. As he is about to play another piece, the jailor yells at them to be quiet. Later, an unknown sympathetic fellow Legionnaire throws in a note that says an escape tunnel leads from their cell to the outside wall. Stan brings on an accidental cave-in which causes the underground path to lead to Francois and Georgette's dwelling. The whole Legion engages in hot pursuit of the boys, who flee to a nearby hangar and hide out in an airplane, which Stan accidentally starts up. The boys repeatedly fly it and land until it crashes. Stan emerges unharmed, but waves a meek goodbye as the angel of Ollie ascends into Heaven. Much later, an elated Stan later bumps into a talking horse, from whom the voice of a reincarnated Ollie grumpily remarks, "Well, here's another nice mess you've gotten me into."

Cast
Principal credited cast members (in order of on-screen credits) and roles:

Michael Visaroff appears uncredited as Georgette's father. Charles B. Middleton reprises the Legion Commandant role he played in Beau Hunks (1931), while Laurel and Hardy's frequent co-star James Finlayson also makes an appearance as a jailer and Arthur Housman as a legionnaire.

Production
As Laurel and Hardy did not have an exclusive contract with Hal Roach, they were able to appear in films for other studios as they pleased. A remake of Beau Hunks, The Flying Deuces was released by RKO Radio Pictures and was made by independent producer Boris Morros. Director A. Edward Sutherland and Stan Laurel did not get along during filming, with Sutherland having reportedly commented that he "would rather eat a tarantula than work with Laurel again".

At the beginning of the film, the innkeeper's daughter is seen looking at a framed photograph of Ollie. The same photograph can also be seen in the short film Our Wife (1931), where the sight of it prompts the father of Ollie's fiancé to forbid the wedding.

The "laundry scene" in The Flying Deuces was filmed on the Iverson Movie Ranch in the Chatsworth section of Los Angeles, California, considered to be the most often used outdoor shooting location for films and television shows. In the scene, the characters played by Laurel and Hardy, having disrupted training camp soon after joining the Foreign Legion, are forced to do a massive amount of laundry—seemingly the laundry for the entire Foreign Legion. For the shoot, a facsimile of a huge pile of laundry was built on top of one of the giant sandstone boulders of Iverson's Garden of the Gods, which is now a park. Aerial footage of the scene, including a large spread consisting of laundry hanging on lines, was shot for the movie, and was used briefly in the final flying scene as the set-up for a gag where the pair's cockpit is pelted with laundry. The footage later turned up in a number of other productions, including the Republic serials Manhunt of Mystery Island (1945) and Radar Patrol vs. Spy King (1949), along with the Allied Artists movie The Cyclops (1957).

Critical reception
On Rotten Tomatoes, The Flying Deuces has a score of 83% based on six critic reviews, with an average rating of 6/10.

Public domain

The Flying Deuces is one of two Laurel and Hardy features in the public domain; the other is Atoll K. As such, it regularly appears as part of inexpensive DVD or video compilations. Turner/Warner Bros. currently possesses the original negative but has not released the film.

When the film was originally released, it contained a scene featuring an escaped shark (a model fin being pulled back and forth) in the river into which Stan and Ollie are planning to jump. The scene was removed from some releases of the film. An uncut version, transferred from a nitrate 35mm negative discovered in France, was restored by Lobster Films and released by Kino Video in 2004. The Legend Films edition contains the edited version of the film.

In the United Kingdom, the Network imprint released the film on DVD and Blu-ray in 2015. This is the uncut version, as are the 2015 DVD-R and Blu-ray releases by VCI Entertainment in America. Unlike previous home video versions that have generally used a snatch of the opening music during the end titles, these releases include the correct closing music. A German-issued Blu-ray released by Edel Germany GmbH in October 2015 includes 3D and 2D versions of the film on a single disc.

Music
 "Shine On, Harvest Moon"
 "The World Is Waiting for the Sunrise"

Popular culture
In an episode of Doctor Who entitled "The Impossible Astronaut" (2011), Amy Pond and Rory Williams watch the film on DVD. Rory sees The Doctor in the film running toward the camera wearing his fez and waving before returning to dance with Stan and Ollie.

The scene in Georgette's bedroom briefly appears on a television in the 1985 film Cocoon.

The image of Stan and Ollie dancing to "Shine on Harvest Moon" appeared in a 1985 Hershey commercial.

The "Shine On, Harvest Moon" sequence appears early in the 1987 film Dot Goes to Hollywood, with Dot dancing with Stan.

See also
 List of films in the public domain in the United States

References

Notes

Bibliography

 Everson, William K. The Complete Films of Laurel and Hardy. New York: Citadel, 2000, (first edition 1967). .
 Louvish, Simon. Stan and Ollie: The Roots of Comedy. London: Faber & Faber, 2001. . 
 McCabe, John. Babe: The Life of Oliver Hardy. London: Robson Books Ltd., 2004. .
 McCabe, John with Al Kilgore and Richard W. Bann. Laurel & Hardy. New York: Bonanza Books, 1983, first edition 1975, E.P. Dutton. .
 McGarry, Annie. Laurel & Hardy. London: Bison Group, 1992. .

External links

 
 
 
 
 

 
 The shoot for the laundry scene in The Flying Deuces at the Iverson Movie Ranch

1939 films
1939 comedy films
American aviation films
American black-and-white films
Films directed by A. Edward Sutherland
Films set in deserts
Films set in Paris
Films about the French Foreign Legion
Laurel and Hardy (film series)
Military humor in film
RKO Pictures films
1930s buddy comedy films
American buddy comedy films
Films with screenplays by Charley Rogers
Films with screenplays by Harry Langdon
1930s English-language films
1930s American films